Welad El-Am, known internationally as Escaping Tel Aviv, is a 2009 Egyptian film directed by Sherif Arafa and starring Karim Abdel Aziz, Sherif Mounir and Mona Zaki.

Cast
 Karim Abdel Aziz (Mostafa)
 Mona Zaki (Salwa)
 Sherif Mounir (Ezzat Abdelhamid/Daniel Navon)
 Entessar (Rachel)
 Salim Kassar (Youshir, Director of Assassinations for Mossad)
 Sabry Abdel Monem (Bodour, Director of Egyptian Intelligence)
 Kinda Alloush (Darren)
 Iman (Sarah, Daniel’s mother)
 Yasser Ali Maher (GIS officer)
 Gerges Jabara (Abu Ziyad)
 Adham Morshed (Abed)
 Mohamed Tharwat (guest of honor)

Plot
Salwa (played by Mona Zaki) is an Egyptian woman who discovers that her husband (played by Sherif Mounir) is a Mossad agent and abducts her with her two young children to Israel. Mostafa (Karim Abdel Aziz), a GIS officer is assigned to rescue Salwa and her children and bring them back to Egypt.

Production
Among many vicissitudes with the filming was an interruption of more than three months while the National Security Agency and other government entities reviewed the script, given the movie’s centering on the intelligence services and foreign relations with Israel and other nations.

Star Karim Abdel Aziz was injured filming an action scene when he fell two floors due to the snap of a guy wire. He was hospitalized and underwent surgery on his foot, followed by physical therapy in Germany, delaying the film’s completion by another two months.

Filming took eight weeks and was completed both outside Egypt (in Cape Town, South Africa and the Syrian Coastal Mountain Range, the latter with the blessing of the government of Syria) and domestically (in Port Said and at Cairo’s Studio Misr and Studio Ahmos.

See also
 Cinema of Egypt
 List of Egyptian films of the 2000s

References

External links
 
 El Cinema page

Egyptian political films
2009 films
2000s Arabic-language films
Anti-Zionism
Anti-Zionism in Egypt
Films about the Arab–Israeli conflict
Egyptian Spy films